Kristaq Antoniu (25 December 1907 – 17 March 1979), also known as Cristache Antoniu in Romanian, was an Albanian-Romanian operetta tenor, baritone, and actor. He was a People's Artist of the People's Republic of Albania.

Biography
Born in Bucharest, the capital of Romania, to an ethnic Albanian family, he lived in Romania, graduating from the Mimic Drama College of Bucharest and the Centro Sperimentale di Cinematografia in Rome. He acquired much of his celebrity by acting in Romanian cinema roles during the late 1920s and early 1930s.

As a concert master and operetta singer, he toured Europe with a group of musicians. He settled in Albania in 1935, and started to expand on his artistic reputation, being widely esteemed for his accomplished interpretation of classical arias and folk songs. A recording of folk songs done for the Columbia society in 1942 was largely arranged by  Pjetër Dungu. Antoniu was the director of the first Albanian opera, Mrika, composed by Prenk Jakova.

Antoniu died in Tirana.

Personal life 
In 1941 he married Albania's first professional woman artist, Androniqi Zengo Antoniu.

References

External links

 M. Blloshmi, "Kristaq Antoniu, një nga yjet e parë të artit shqiptar", in Shekulli

Romanian people of Albanian descent
Romanian emigrants to Albania
20th-century Romanian male singers
20th-century Romanian singers
20th-century Albanian male singers
Musicians from Bucharest
1907 births
1979 deaths
Centro Sperimentale di Cinematografia alumni
20th-century Romanian male actors
20th-century Albanian male actors